Young Kwok Wai (born 3 September 1929) is a Hong Kong former sports shooter. He competed in the 25 metre pistol event at the 1968 Summer Olympics. He also competed at the 1966 and 1974 Asian Games.

References

External links
 

1929 births
Possibly living people
Hong Kong male sport shooters
Olympic shooters of Hong Kong
Shooters at the 1968 Summer Olympics
Place of birth missing (living people)
Shooters at the 1966 Asian Games
Shooters at the 1974 Asian Games
Asian Games competitors for Hong Kong